The 14th TCA Awards were presented by the Television Critics Association in a ceremony hosted by Ray Romano held on July 18, 1998, at the Ritz-Carlton Huntington Hotel and Spa in Pasadena, Calif.

Winners and nominees

Multiple wins 
The following shows received multiple wins:

Multiple nominations 
The following shows received multiple nominations:

References

External links 
 Official website 
 1998 TCA Awards at IMDb.com

1998 television awards
1998 in American television
TCA Awards ceremonies